Dark Interlude is an Australian novel by E. V. Timms.

References

External links
Dark Interlude at AustLit

1939 Australian novels
Angus & Robertson books